César Martínez Gutiérrez (born May 12, 1995) is a Mexican footballer who plays as a midfielder for Guadalupe F.C. of the Liga FPD on loan from Monterrey.

References

 Guadalupe FC Player (Spanish)

External links
 
 
 Guadalupe FC Player (Spanish)

Footballers from Nuevo León
Sportspeople from Monterrey
Liga MX players
C.F. Monterrey players
Liga FPD players
1995 births
Living people
Association football midfielders
Mexican footballers